is one of the commendations bestowed by the Prime Minister of Japan on people in recognition of their accomplishments in sport, entertainment, and other fields. The award, not restricted to Japanese nationals, was created in 1977 by the then-Prime Minister Takeo Fukuda.

Recipients

Known to have declined the honor
Yutaka Fukumoto (1983)
Yūji Koseki (1989, by the bereaved family)
Ichiro Suzuki (2001, 2004, 2019)
Shohei Ohtani (2021)

References

Japanese awards

Awards established in 1977
1977 establishments in Japan